Ferdinand Weerth (1 June 1774 in Gemarke – 18 October 1836 in Detmold) was a German pastor and school-reformer in the Principality of Lippe. Between 1805 and 1836 he officiated as the general superintendent (spiritual leader) of the Reformed Church of Lippe. One of his sons was the writer Georg Weerth.

References

1774 births
1836 deaths
German Calvinist and Reformed ministers
German male non-fiction writers